Portugal competed at the 1996 Summer Olympics in Atlanta, United States.

A delegation with a record number of 107 competitors (83 men and 24 women) participated in 79 events in 18 sports. Two medals were won this time, one of them being Portugal's third Olympic gold, thanks to Fernanda Ribeiro's surprising victory in the women's 10000m over the 5000m Olympic champion Wang Junxia. This third Olympic title in the athletics reinforced Portugal's strength in this sport and in particular the long-distance endurance events. A bronze was achieved by the 470 class male team, reviving a successful sailing tradition in this nation's Olympic delegations.

In Atlanta, Portugal debuted in cycling, women's sailing classes, slalom canoeing, and in newly promoted beach volleyball, almost grabbing a bronze medal in the latter, on its first participation.  In their second appearance, the tennis male team succumbed yet again on the first round to a Bahamian team. After 68 years, Portugal sent a football team to the Olympics and, in the end, it repeated Amsterdam's fourth place.

Medalists

Gold
 Fernanda Ribeiro — Athletics, Women's 10000m.

Bronze
 Hugo Rocha and Nuno Barreto — Sailing, Men's 470.

Archery

Men's Individual Competition:
 Nuno Pombo
 Ranking round — 650 pts (→ 35th)
{| class="wikitable" style="text-align:center;"
!Round!!1st half!!2nd half!!Total
|-
!Pts
|322||328||650
|}
 Elimination rounds — 148 pts (→ 58th)
 1/32 finals — Pawel Szymczak (POL) (→ lost by 152-148, did not advance)

Athletics

Men's events
100m:
 Luís Cunha
 Round 1 (heat 1) — 10.65 (→ 6th, did not advance)

800m:
 António Abrantes
 Round 1 (heat 5) — 1:47.73 (→ 5th, did not advance)

1500m:
 António Travassos
 Round 1 (heat 3) — 3:42.01 (→ 10th, did not advance)
 Luís Feiteira
 Round 1 (heat 4) — 3:38.09 (→ 5th, advanced as 4th fastest loser)
 Semi-final 1 — 3:40.31 (→ 11th, did not advance)
 Luís Jesus
 Round 1 (heat 2) — 3:44.65 (→ 7th, did not advance)

5000m:
 José Ramos
 Round 1 (heat 1) — 14:17.26 (→ 8th)
 Semi-final 1 — 14:24.81 (→ 15th, did not advance)
 Luís Jesus
 Round 1 (heat 3) — 14:08.87 (→ 11th, advanced as 9th fastest loser)
 Semi-final 2 — did not start

10000m:
 Alfredo Braz
 Round 1 (heat 2) — 28:50.58 (→ 14th, did not advance)
 Carlos Patrício
 Round 1 (heat 1) — 29:15.41 (→ 15th, did not advance)
 Paulo Guerra
 Round 1 (heat 2) — did not finish

Marathon:
 António Pinto — 2:16:41 (→ 14th)
 Domingos Castro — 2:18:03 (→ 25th)
 Manuel Matias — 2:20:58 (→ 46th)

20 km Walk:
 José Urbano — 1:25:32 (→ 31st)

50 km Walk:
 José Magalhães — 4:27:37 (→ 36th)

400m Hurdles:
 Carlos Silva
 Round 1 (heat 2) — 49.09s (→ 3rd, did not advance)

3000m Steeplechase:
 Eduardo Henriques
 Round 1 (heat 1) — 8:35.58 (→ 8th, did not advance)
 Vítor Almeida
 Round 1 (heat 2) — 8:48.16 (→ 11th, did not advance)

Long Jump:
 Carlos Calado
 Qualifying round (Group A) — 7,81 (→ 12th, did not advance)
{| class="wikitable" style="text-align:center;"
!width=20%|1!!width=20%|2!!width=20%|3!!Result
|-
|7,36||7,81||X||7,81
|}

Pole Vault:
 Nuno Fernandes
 Qualifying round (Group A) — 5,60 (→ 10th, did not advance)
{| class="wikitable" style="text-align:center;"
!5,20!!5,40!!5,60!!5,70!!Result
|-
|XO||O||XXO||XXX||5,60
|}

Triple Jump:
 Carlos Calado
 Qualifying round (Group A) — 16,65 (→ 10th, did not advance)
{| class="wikitable" style="text-align:center;"
!width=20%|1!!width=20%|2!!width=20%|3!!Result
|-
|16,43||16,65||X||16,65
|}

Women's events
100m:
 Lucrécia Jardim
 Round 1 (heat 6) — 11.32 (→ 3rd)
 Round 2 (heat 2) — 11.37 (→ 4th)
 Semi-final 2 — 11.32 (→ 8th, did not advance)

200m:
 Lucrécia Jardim
 Round 1 (heat 2) — 22.95 (→ 3rd)
 Round 2 (heat 3) — 22.98 (→ 5th, did not advance)

800m:
 Eduarda Coelho
 Round 1 (heat 2) — 2:03.22 (→ 5th, did not advance)

1500m:
 Carla Sacramento
 Round 1 (heat 2) — 4:13.57 (→ 3rd)
 Semi-final 2 — 4:06.70 (→ 5th)
 Final — 4:03.91 (→ 6th)

5000m:
 Ana Dias
 Round 1 (heat 2) — 15:57.35 (→ 11th, did not advance)

10000m:
 Conceição Ferreira
 Round 1 (heat 1) — 33:40.76 (→ 14th, did not advance)
 Fernanda Ribeiro
 Round 1 (heat 2) — 31:36.32 (→ 3rd)
 Final — 31:01.63 OR (→  Gold Medal)

Marathon:
 Manuela Machado — 2:31:11 (→ 7th)
 Albertina Dias — 2:26:39 (→ 27th)
 Albertina Machado — 2:43:44 → (47th)

10 km Walk:
 Susana Feitor — 44:24 (→ 13th)

Discus Throw: 
 Teresa Machado 
 Qualifying round (Group A) — 62,02 (→ 5th) 
{| class="wikitable" style="text-align:center;"
!width=20%|1!!width=20%|2!!width=20%|3!!Result
|-
|59,14||62,02||||62,02
|}
 Final — 61,38 (→ 10th)
{| class="wikitable" style="text-align:center;"
!width=20%|1!!width=20%|2!!width=20%|3!!Result
|-
|61,38||60,48||60,02||61,38
|}

Shot Put: 
 Teresa Machado 
 Qualifying round (Group A) — 15,91 (→ 12th, did not advance) 
{| class="wikitable" style="text-align:center;"
!width=20%|1!!width=20%|2!!width=20%|3!!Result
|-
|15,91||15,62||15,60||15,91
|}

Beach volleyball

Men's Competition:
 João Brenha and Miguel Maia — 4th
 Round 1 — Michel Everaert and Sander Mulder (NED) (→ won by 15-8)
 Round 2 — Carl Henkel and Sinjin Smith (USA) (→ lost by 15-7)
 17th place round — Javier Yuste Muniz and Miguel Angel Martin Prieto (ESP) (→ won by 15-8)
 13th place round — Eduardo Esteban Martinez and Martin Alejo Conde (ARG) (→ won by 15-5)
 9th place round — Emanuel Rego and José Marco de Melo Ferreira (BRA) (→ won by 15-12)
 7th place round — Björn Maaseide and Jan Kvalheim (NOR) (→ won by 15-3)
 5th place round — Carl Henkel and Sinjin Smith (USA) (→ won by 15-13)
 Semi-finals — Mike Dodd and Mike Whitmarsh (USA) (→ lost by 15-13)
 Bronze medal match — John Child and Mark Heese (CAN) (→ lost by 12-5, 12-8)

Canoeing

Slalom

Sprint
Men

Cycling

Men's Road Race:
 Cândido Barbosa — 5:01:29 (→ 112th)
 José Azevedo — did not finish
 Nuno Marta — 4:56:49 (→ 78th)
 Orlando Rodrigues — 4:56:45 (→ 39th)
 Pedro Lopes — 4:56:45 (→ 48th)

Women's Road Race:
 Ana Barros — 2:37:06 (→ 23rd)

Equestrianism

Individual Jumping:
 António Vozone
 Qualifying round — 13.75 penalty pts (→ 69th)
{| class="wikitable" style="text-align:center;"
!rowspan=2|Time!!colspan=3|Penalties!!rowspan=2|Rank
|-
!Obstacle!!Time!!Total
|-
|111.50||12||1.75||13.75||69th
|}

 Miguel Leal
 Qualifying round — 12.00 penalty pts (→ 59th)
{| class="wikitable" style="text-align:center;"
!rowspan=2|Time!!colspan=3|Penalties!!rowspan=2|Rank
|-
!Obstacle!!Time!!Total
|-
|102.37||12||0.00||12.00||59th
|}

Fencing

One male fencer represented Portugal in 1996.

Men's épée
 Nuno Frazão
 Round A — Vitally Zakharov (BLR) (→ lost by 15-11, did not advance)

Football

Men's Competition:
 Afonso Martins, Litos, Dani, Kenedy, Emílio Peixe, Hugo Porfírio, José Dominguez, Calado, José Vidigal, Andrade, Nuno Afonso, Nuno Gomes, Nuno Espírito Santo, Paulo Alves, Costinha, Beto, Rui Bento and Rui Jorge — 4th
 Group stage (A) — 5 pts (→ 2nd, 1 scored goal less than Argentina)  
 July 20 | Washington D.C. — Tunisia (→ won by 2-0; goals by: Afonso Agra)
 July 22 | Washington D.C. — Argentina (→ draw 1-1; goals by: Nuno Ribeiro)
 July 24 | Washington D.C. — United States (→ draw 1-1; goals by: Paulo Alves)
 Quarter-finals
 July 27 | Miami, Florida — France (→ won by 2-1; goals by: Nuno Rocha, José Silva)
 Semi-finals
 July 30 | Athens, Georgia — Argentina (→ lost by 2-0)
 Bronze medal match
 August 2 | Athens, Georgia — Brazil (→ lost by 5-0)

Gymnastics

Women's Individual All-Round Competition:
 Diana Teixeira — 72.609 pts (→ 66th)
{|class=wikitable style="text-align:center;"
!Round!!Balance Beam!!Vault!!Uneven Bars!!Floor!!Total
|- 
!Ia
|8.812||9.425||9.112||9.187||36.536
|-
!Ib
|8.437||9.337||9.437||8.862||36.073
|-
!Total (Rank)
|17.249 (81st)||18.762 (55th)||18.549 (66th)||18.049 (86th)||72.609
|}

Judo

Men's Extra Lightweight (–60 kg):
 Pedro Caravana
Pool A
 Round 1 — Ewan Beaton (CAN) (→ won by waza-ari)
 Round 2 — Nigel Donohue (GBR) (→ lost by ippon)

Men's Half Lightweight (–65 kg):
 Michel Almeida
Pool A
 Round 1 — Jose Perez (PUR) (→ won by ippon)
 Round 2 — Francesco Giorgi (ITA) (→ won by koka)
 Round 3 — Taro Tan (CAN) (→ won by yuko)
 1/4 finals — Udo Quellmalz (GER) (→ lost by ippon)
Repêchage A
 Round 1 — Bye
 Round 2 — Bye
 Round 3 — Israel Hernández Plana (CUB) (→ lost by ippon, did not advance)

Men's Lightweight (–71 kg):
 Guilherme Bentes
Pool A
 Round 1 — Bye
 Round 2 — Loris Mularoni (SMR) (→ won by ippon)
 Round 3 — Vladimeri Dgebuadze (GEO) (→ lost by yusei-gachi, did not advance)

Men's Half Heavyweight (–95 kg):
 Pedro Soares
Pool A
 Round 1 — Bye
 Round 2 — Detlef Knorrek (GER) (→ won by ippon)
 Round 3 — A. Sanchez Armentero (CUB) (→ won by ippon)
 1/4 finals — Pawel Nastula (POL) (→ lost by ippon)
Repêchage A
 Round 1 — Bye
 Round 2 — Bye
 Round 3 — Antal Kovács (HUN) (→ lost by shido, did not advance)

Women's Lightweight (–56 kg):
 Filipa Cavalleri
Pool B
 Round 1 — Bye
 Round 2 — Ai-Chun Huang (TPE) (→ lost by yusei-gachi)

Modern pentathlon

Men's Individual Competition:
 Manuel Barroso — 5246 pts (→ 19th)
{|class=wikitable style="text-align:center;"
!rowspan=3|Event
!colspan=3|Fencing
!colspan=2|Swimming
!colspan=2|Shooting
!colspan=2|Cross-country
!colspan=2|Riding
!rowspan=3|Total
|-
!Vict.!!Def.!!Pen.
!Time!!Pen.
!Hits!!Pen.
!Time!!Pen.
!Time!!Pen.
|-
|11||20||0
|3:23.35||0
|171||0
|12:45.69||0
|75.07||30
|-
!Pts (Rank)
|colspan=3|670 (28th)
|colspan=2|1248 (19th)
|colspan=2|988 (24th)
|colspan=2|1270 (7th)
|colspan=2|1070 (5th)
|5246 (19th)
|}

Rowing

Men's Lightweight Coxless Four:
 Henrique Baixinho, João Fernandes, Manuel Fernandes (stern) and Samuel Aguiar (bow)
 Round 1 (heat 2) — 7:37.13 (→ 6th)
 Repêchage 3 — 6:15.82 (→ 5th)
 Final C — 6:27.07 (→ 3rd, 15th overall)

Sailing

Men's events
Finn:
 Vasco Batista — 129 pts (→ 22nd)
{|class=wikitable style="text-align:center;"
!Race!!1!!2!!3!!4!!5!!6!!7!!8!!9!!10!!rowspan=2|Total!!rowspan=2|Net
|-
!Place
|16th||23rd||23rd||22nd||26th||7th||22nd||14th||16th||9th
|-
!Pts
|16||23||23||22||26||7||22||14||16||9||178||129
|}

Mistral:
 João Rodrigues — 42 pts (→ 7th)
{|class=wikitable style="text-align:center;"
!Race!!1!!2!!3!!4!!5!!6!!7!!8!!9!!rowspan=2|Total!!rowspan=2|Net
|-
!Place
|14th||8th||9th||5th||2nd||4th||6th||12th||8th
|-
!Pts
|14||8||9||5||2||4||6||12||8||68||42
|}

470:
 Hugo Rocha (skipper) and Nuno Barreto — 62 pts (→  Bronze Medal)
{|class=wikitable style="text-align:center;"
!Race!!1!!2!!3!!4!!5!!6!!7!!8!!9!!10!!11!!rowspan=2|Total!!rowspan=2|Net
|-
!Place
|5th||10th||17th||7th||4th||8th||9th||5th||2nd||12th||15th
|-
!Pts
|5||10||17||7||4||8||9||5||2||12||15||94||62
|}

Women's events
Europe:
 Joana Pratas — 209 pts (→ 25th)
{|class=wikitable style="text-align:center;"
!Race!!1!!2!!3!!4!!5!!6!!7!!8!!9!!10!!11!!rowspan=2|Total!!rowspan=2|Net
|-
!Place
|25th||24th||23rd||27th||25th||23rd||16th||24th||24th||25th||26th
|-
!Pts
|25||24||23||27||25||23||16||24||24||25||26||262||209
|}

Mistral:
 Catarina Fagundes — 133 pts (→ 21st)
{|class=wikitable style="text-align:center;"
!Race!!1!!2!!3!!4!!5!!6!!7!!8!!9!!rowspan=2|Total!!rowspan=2|Net
|-
!Place
|False start||16th||19th||21st||15th||23rd||23rd||19th||20th
|-
!Pts
|28||16||19||21||15||23||23||19||20||184||133
|}

Open events
Laser:
 Vasco Serpa — 74 pts (→ 7th)
{|class=wikitable style="text-align:center;"
!Race!!1!!2!!3!!4!!5!!6!!7!!8!!9!!10!!11!!rowspan=2|Total!!rowspan=2|Net
|-
!Place
|8th||3rd||10th||False start||3rd||9th||11th||11th||12th||16th||7th
|-
!Pts
|8||3||10||57||3||9||11||11||12||16||7||147||74
|}

Star:
 Diogo Cayolla and Raul Costa — 129 pts(→ 21st)
{|class=wikitable style="text-align:center;"
!Race!!1!!2!!3!!4!!5!!6!!7!!8!!9!!10!!rowspan=2|Total!!rowspan=2|Net
|-
!Place
|19th||15th||16th||15th||18th||14th||20th||18th||21st||14th
|-
!Pts
|19||15||16||15||18||14||20||18||21||14||170||129
|}

Shooting

Men's Trap:
 João Rebelo
 Preliminary round — 120 hits (→ 13th, did not advance)
{|class="wikitable" style="text-align:center;"
!Round!!1!!2!!3!!4!!5!!Total
|-
!Hits
|25||23||22||25||25||120
|}

 Manuel Vieira
 Preliminary round — 122 hits (→ 5th, did not advance)
{|class="wikitable" style="text-align:center;"
!Round!!1!!2!!3!!4!!5!!Total
|-
!Hits
|24||23||25||25||25||122
|}

Women's 10m Air Rifle:
 Carla Ribeiro
 Preliminary round — 375hits (→ 48th, did not advance)
{|class="wikitable" style="text-align:center;"
!Round!!1!!2!!3!!4!!Total
|-
!Hits
|95||93||91||96||375
|}

 Sara Antunes
 Preliminary round — 377 hits (→ 47th, did not advance)
{|class="wikitable" style="text-align:center;"
!Round!!1!!2!!3!!4!!Total
|-
!Hits
|91||94||93||99||377
|}

Women's 50m Rifle 3 Positions:
 Carla Ribeiro
 Preliminary round — 568 hits (→ 32nd, did not advance)
{|class="wikitable" style="text-align:center;"
!Position!!Prone!!Knee!!Standing!!Total
|-
!Hits
|197||180||191||568
|}

 Sara Antunes
 Preliminary round — 571 hits (→ 29th, did not advance)
{|class="wikitable" style="text-align:center;"
!Position!!Prone!!Knee!!Standing!!Total
|-
!Hits
|195||185||191||571
|}

Swimming

Men's events
50m Freestyle:
 Paulo Trindade
 Heats (heat 5) — 23.73 (→ 5th, did not advance – 41st overall)

1500m Freestyle:
 Pedro Ferreira
 Heats (heat 2) — 16:34.55 (→ 7th, did not advance)

100m Backstroke:
 Nuno Laurentino
 Heats (heat 4) — 57.59 (→ 7th, did not advance – 31st overall)

200m Backstroke:
 Nuno Laurentino
 Heats (heat 3) — 2:05.95 (→ 7th, did not advance – 29th overall)

200m Breaststroke:
 José Couto
 Heats (heat 2) — 2:17.28 (→ 2nd, did not advance – 18th overall)

200m Butterfly:
 Diogo Madeira
 Heats (heat 3) — 2:01.58 (→ 3rd, did not advance – 25th overall)

4×100m Medley Relay:
 José Couto, Miguel Cabrita, Miguel Machado and Nuno Laurentino
 Heats (heat 4) — disqualified

Women's events
200m Freestyle:
 Ana Alegria
 Heats (heat 3) — 2:05.16 (→ 4th, did not advance – 29th overall)

400m Freestyle:
 Ana Alegria
 Heats (heat 2) — 4:27.19 (→ 8th, did not advance)

100m Backstroke:
 Maria Santos
 Heats (heat 5) — 1:04.84 (→ 8th, did not advance – 22nd overall)

200m Backstroke:
 Petra Chaves
 Heats (heat 2) — 2:20.49 (→ 3rd, did not advance – 26th overall)

200m Breaststroke:
 Joana Soutinho
 Heats (heat 2) — 1:13.73 (→ 3rd, did not advance – 34th overall)

100m Butterfly:
 Ana Francisco
 Heats (heat 2) — 1:02.98 (→ 1st, did not advance – 26th overall)

200m Butterfly:
 Ana Francisco
 Heats (heat 3) — 2:17.61 (→ 7th, did not advance)

200m Individual Medley:
 Petra Chaves
 Heats (heat 2) — 2:22.03 (→ 3rd, did not advance – 33rd overall)

4×100m Medley Relay:
 Ana Alegria, Ana Francisco, Joana Soutinho and Maria Santos
 Heats (heat 3) — 4:21.61 (→ 7th, did not advance – 21st overall)

Tennis

Men's Doubles Competition:
 Bernardo Mota and Emanuel Couto
 Round 1 — Mark Knowles and Roger Smith (BAH) (→ lost by 7-6, 7-6 – did not advance)

Weightlifting

Men's Bantamweight (–59 kg):
 Nuno Alves
Group B — 237,5 kg (→ 14th)
{|class=wikitable style="text-align:center;"
!rowspan=2|Event!!colspan=3|Attempt!!rowspan=2|Result
|-
!1!!2!!3
|-
!Snatch
|||||||102,5
|-
!Clean& Jerk
|||||||135,0
|-
!colspan=4|Total
|237,5
|}

Wrestling

Men's Greco-Roman Bantamweight (–57 kg):
 David Maia
 Round 1 — Luis Sarmiento Hernández (CUB) (→ lost by 5-0)
 Round 2 — Armando Fernández (MEX) (→ lost by 7-3, did not advance)

Officials
 Vítor Fonseca da Mota (chief of mission)
 Avelino Corbal Simões Azevedo (beach volleyball)
 Nelo Vingada (football coach)
 Agostinho Oliveira (football coach)

Notes

References

Nations at the 1996 Summer Olympics
1996
Olympics